Adriaan Andries Jacobus Bester (born ) is a South African rugby union player for the  in the Currie Cup and the  in the Rugby Challenge. His regular position is lock.

References

South African rugby union players
Living people
1996 births
People from Middelburg, Mpumalanga
Rugby union locks
Golden Lions players
Rugby union players from Mpumalanga